Salug is a municipality in the province of Zamboanga del Norte, Philippines.

Salug may also refer to:
 Salug River, a river in the Philippines
 Salug language, one of the Subanen languages of the Philippines
 Salug, Iran (disambiguation), several villages in Iran

See also 
 Salog
 Sulug Island